The 1986 Scheldeprijs was the 73rd edition of the Scheldeprijs cycle race and was held on 25 August 1986. The race was won by Jean-Paul van Poppel.

General classification

References

1986
1986 in road cycling
1986 in Belgian sport